Bongawan is a town in the West Coast Division of the state of Sabah in Malaysia. It is situated within the parliamentary constituency of Kimanis. The town center is 3 kilometers inland from the South China Sea and approximately 70 kilometers south of Kota Kinabalu, the state capital. It is located on the A2 highway connecting Kota Kinabalu and the southern part of Sabah, and Bongawan railway station is one of the stops for Sabah State Railway.

Bongawan is noted for its two blocks of wooden shoplots, which were completed in 1939. They are among a few surviving pre-World War II era shophouses surviving in Sabah. Most of the shops are operated by Chinese traders, most of whom belong to the Hakka dialect group.

The town is also noted for the Borneo Golf and Country Club, an 18-hole golf course designed by Jack Nicklaus.  The course plays 6546 metres off the championship tees and is spread out over 200 acres on a 900-acre site.

Education

Primary school
 SK Viging Ulu
 SK Ulu Lumagar
 SK Sumbiling
 SK Pekan Bongawan
 SK Nyaris-Nyaris
 SK Mandahan
 SJK (C) Bong Hwa

Secondary school
SMK Bongawan

Etymology  
The name Bongawan comes from the Malay word Bangau, which means 'egrets'. These birds are commonly seen in the paddy fields surrounding the town.

References 

 Towns in Sabah